Alexandra Antonietta Ciabattoni (born 1 June 1994) is an Australian former professional basketball player and current coach of the South West Slammers of the NBL1 West.

Early life
Ciabattoni was born and raised in Adelaide, South Australia. She attended Mary MacKillop College in the suburb of Kensington and played basketball in the Central ABL for the Southern Tigers and South Adelaide Panthers between 2010 and 2013.

College career
In 2012, Ciabattoni moved to the United States to play college basketball for Newman University in Wichita, Kansas. As a freshman in 2012–13, she was named to the All-Heartland Conference First Team and received Heartland Conference Freshman of the Year honours. She averaged team highs in points (13.7) and rebounds (7.8) per game.

As a sophomore at Newman in 2013–14, Ciabattoni was named to the Heartland Conference Women's Basketball All-Tournament Team. Along with being All-Tournament, Ciabattoni was the Heartland Conference Player of the Year, All-Heartland Conference First Team and a three-time Heartland Conference Player of the Week. She averaged a league-best 20.3 points and shot a league-best 59.5 percent (sixth highest total in the NCAA).

Following the 2013–14 season, Ciabattoni left Newman and signed a Grant-in-Aid offer from Stetson on 3 June 2014. Due to NCAA transfer regulations, she was forced to redshirt the 2014–15 season. While she was unable to play for Stetson, she did earn Atlantic Sun All-Academic Team honors for the 2014–15 season.

Professional career
While back in Adelaide during the 2015 off-season, Ciabattoni decided to try out for the Adelaide Lightning, a team scrambling for players in the wake of the club's near off-season dissolution. As a result, she did not return to Stetson for the 2015–16 season; instead, she signed with the Lightning in August 2015 and went on to win the WNBL Rookie of the Year Award. Ciabattoni averaged 4.6 points per game at 46 per cent and 2.4 rebounds.

Following her rookie season in the WNBL, Ciabattoni joined the Albury Wodonga Bandits for the 2016 SEABL season. In 22 games for the Bandits, she averaged 12.1 points, 6.0 rebounds and 2.2 assists per game.

In June 2016, Ciabattoni re-signed with the Adelaide Lightning for the 2016–17 WNBL season.

In March 2017, Ciabattoni joined the Hobart Chargers for the 2017 SEABL season. Ciabattoni was rushed into the squad as a replacement for American Cassie Cooke, who was ruled out for the season with a knee injury. After originally signing with the Melbourne Tigers, Ciabattoni felt it wasn't the right fit and ended up landing in Hobart.

On 1 August 2017, Ciabattoni signed with the Perth Lynx for the 2017–18 WNBL season. Following the WNBL season, she joined the Kalamunda Eastern Suns for the 2018 WSBL season.

Ciabattoni split the 2018–19 season in Italy, starting with Reyer Venezia before being loaned to Ponzano Basket Veneto in February 2019. In June 2019, he she joined the Rockingham Flames for the rest of the 2019 WSBL season. In August 2019, she helped the Flames win the championship.

For the 2019–20 season, Ciabattoni returned to Reyer Venezia. In November 2019, she left Reyer and joined rival team Treofan Battipaglia for the rest of the season.

Ciabattoni returned to the Perth Lynx for the 2020 WNBL Hub season and then returned to the Rockingham Flames for the 2021 NBL1 West season.

In June 2021, Ciabattoni re-signed with the Lynx for the 2021–22 WNBL season. In May 2022, she joined the South West Slammers for the 2022 NBL1 West season.

Coaching career
In December 2022, Ciabattoni was appointed head coach of the South West Slammers for the 2023 NBL1 West season.

Personal life
Ciabattoni holds an Italian passport.

She gave birth to her first child in January 2023.

References

External links
Alex Ciabattoni at fiba.basketball
Alex Ciabattoni at sportstg.com
"Gun Hobart Chargers guard Alex Ciabattoni making a move back to the WNBL" at themercury.com.au

1994 births
Living people
Adelaide Lightning players
Australian women's basketball players
Forwards (basketball)
Newman University, Wichita alumni
Perth Lynx players